Paul Hubbard Jr. (born June 12, 1985) is a former American football wide receiver. He was drafted by the Cleveland Browns in the sixth round of the 2008 NFL Draft. He played college football at Wisconsin.

Hubbard has also been a member of the Oakland Raiders and Buffalo Bills

Early years
Hubbard played high school football at Widefield High School in Colorado Springs. At Widefield High School, he played with Vincent Jackson of the Tampa Bay Buccaneers.

Professional career

Buffalo Bills
Hubbard was signed to the Buffalo Bills practice squad on September 6, 2010.
He was released by the team on August 28, 2011.

Winnipeg Blue Bombers
Hubbard signed with the Winnipeg Blue Bombers of the Canadian Football League (CFL) on May 24, 2012.

References

1985 births
Living people
American football wide receivers
Buffalo Bills players
Cleveland Browns players
Oakland Raiders players
Wisconsin Badgers football players
Players of American football from Colorado Springs, Colorado